Asher Baer (early 19th century, Seiny – 1897, Jerusalem) was a Russian Jewish mathematician and engraver.

He made many important discoveries in mathematics and especially in mechanics. He discovered a method by which the same force causes two different movements of two equal cog-wheels to dovetail with each other. His engravings were awarded a prize at the Königsberg Exhibition of 1858. The German press of that time devoted many articles to Baer's valuable inventions, and Ossip Rabbinovich and O. Wohl in the Russo-Jewish periodicals Razsvyet and Ha-Karmel spoke highly of his talent. In the later part of the 1860s Baer went to Jerusalem, whence he wrote correspondence for many years for Ha-Maggid and other Hebrew periodicals.

References
 

1897 deaths
19th-century engravers
19th-century mathematicians from the Russian Empire
Emigrants from the Russian Empire to the Ottoman Empire
Jews from the Russian Empire
Journalists from the Russian Empire
Physicists from the Russian Empire
People from Sejny County
Russian engravers